Tatarenkova is a rural locality in Nizhnemedveditsky Selsoviet Rural Settlement, Kursky District, Kursk Oblast, Russia. Population:

Geography 
The village is located 96 km from the Russia–Ukraine border, at the northern border of the town of Kursk, 5 km from the selsoviet center – Verkhnyaya Medveditsa.

 Climate
Tatarenkova has a warm-summer humid continental climate (Dfb in the Köppen climate classification).

Transport 
Tatarenkova is located on the federal route  Crimea Highway (a part of the European route ), 9 km from the nearest railway station Kursk (railway lines: Oryol – Kursk, Kursk – 146 km and Lgov-I – Kursk).

The rural locality is situated 12 km from Kursk Vostochny Airport, 132 km from Belgorod International Airport and 212 km from Voronezh Peter the Great Airport.

References

Notes

Sources

Rural localities in Kursky District, Kursk Oblast